Asia Pacific Harmonica Festival (APHF, Chinese:亞太口琴節, Japanese:アジア太平洋ハーモニカ大会) is one of the world's largest harmonica events.  It is held every two years. The first APHF was held in Taipei in 1996.

List of APHF Events

External links
 5th APHF 2004 Official Homepage
 7th APHF 2008 Official Homepage
 9th Asia Pacific Harmonica Festival Memorial Official Website
 10th Asia Pacific Harmonica Festive Official Website

A
Music festivals in Asia
Music festivals in Oceania